Stamford railway station serves the town of Stamford in Lincolnshire, England, and is located in St Martin's. It was opened by the Syston and Peterborough Railway, part of the present day Birmingham to Peterborough Line. CrossCountry operate the majority of services as part of their Birmingham to Stansted Airport  route. It is owned by Network Rail and managed by East Midlands Railway

The station was formerly known as Stamford Town to distinguish it from the now closed Stamford East station in Water Street. It is often printed on timetables and train tickets as Stamford (Lincs) to distinguish it from either Stamford Hill station in London or Stanford-le-Hope station in Essex.

The station building is a fine stone structure in Mock Tudor style, influenced by the nearby Burghley House, and designed by Sancton Wood. It was upgraded to Grade II* listed building status in March 2020.

Services
From Stamford there is generally an hourly service (operated by CrossCountry) each day towards Leicester and Birmingham New Street westbound and Peterborough, Cambridge and Stansted Airport eastbound as well as additional PM peak hour services.

Services westbound to Birmingham go via Oakham, Melton Mowbray, Leicester, Narborough, Hinckley, Nuneaton and Coleshill. Services eastbound to Stansted Airport or Cambridge call at Peterborough, March, Ely and Audley End.

Despite managing the station, East Midlands Railway only operates three daily services to the station (mainly for train crew route knowledge purposes); two early morning services to Norwich and a late night service to Nottingham.

Development

Central Trains undertook internal modifications and refurbishment to the ticket office and booking hall towards the end of their franchise. Network Rail also invested £500,000 on refurbishment of the station building, modern lighting, overbridge and foot crossing to further update the station in late 2007.

In late July 2008, Network Rail was granted listed building consent to make alterations to the then Grade II listed station building to enable larger freight trains of W10 loading gauge to travel on the Peterborough to Nuneaton route. This will involve changes to the platform alignment and the platform canopy and a temporary platform will be provided during the works.

It is planned that both platforms will be extended by up to 5 metres by no later than 2012.

History

Openings

Opened by the Midland Railway on its Syston and Peterborough Railway, train services began on 2 October 1846 on the Peterborough to Stamford section, using a temporary station in Water Street, as the tunnel was not complete. The contract for the erection of the permanent station was obtained by Groocock and Yates of Leicester in 1847. The permanent station opened along with through services to Leicester on 20 March 1848.

The London and North Western Railway opened their single track branch line from Rugby via Market Harborough on 2 June 1851. This actually joined the Midland line at Luffenham, but trains generally worked through to Stamford and terminated in the LNWR bay, platform 3, the far side of the current Leicester platform, which is now disused and filled in.

In 1863, the weekday train service comprised 5 each way per day on the Peterborough - Stamford - Leicester route, 3 each way per day on the Stamford - Market Harborough - Rugby route, and 1 each way per day on the Stamford - Market Harborough - Northampton route, including through coaches to London Euston, then known as Euston Square.

Closures

When Stamford East station closed in 1957, the Stamford to Essendine services were diverted to Town station, but these services ceased in 1959. Some minor stations on the Midland line closed in the 1950s and 1960s and the remaining village stations such as Helpston and Ketton & Collyweston closed in 1966, along with the Seaton branch line from Luffenham.

1970s
With the end of steam traction, the service in the 1970s and early 1980s generally comprised a stopping service formed of 2-car DMUs running between Peterborough and Leicester every two hours, supplemented by a two or three times a day Peterborough to Stamford shuttle service. There was also a four or five times daily through Birmingham to Norwich service usually formed by a Class 31 with four or five Mark 1 coaches, these services generally ran non-stop between Peterborough and Leicester.

1980s
General goods services in Stamford finished in the late 1960s but the coal yard remained in use until 16 May 1983.

When the coal yard closed, the opportunity was also taken to close the signal box. All pointwork was removed and mechanical signals were replaced by colour lights controlled by Ketton signal box. Ketton signal box was retained due to the need to monitor the level crossing.
With no crossover, the Peterborough to Stamford shuttles were for a time reversed at Ketton, before being withdrawn altogether.

With the line to the bay platform lifted, the bay was filled in to form a flowerbed.

1990s
In the late 1990s, the toilets were closed, having been the subject of vandalism and variously available since the 1960s.  The ticket office is only open in the mornings.  The small bicycle rack outside the station was removed.

Summary of former train services

Timetable for February 1863 
The table below shows the train departures from Stamford Town on weekdays in February 1863.

Timetable for July 1922 
The table below shows the train departures from Stamford Town on weekdays in July 1922.

Stationmasters
In 1853 the station master Thomas Liddell had travelled to Barrowden, intending to return by train but on arriving at Luffenham, he discovered it was too late for the train home. When he got to Ketton, he persuaded a porter to get out a truck, which he proposed to ride home in, thinking that the line from Ketton to Stamford was on a descent, he would be able to travel the 3 miles without propulsion. After initial success, the truck stopped at the bridge approaching Easton-wood and he could not get it moving again on his own. After assistance from the gatekeeper he managed to reach Stamford. The incident reached the directors of the Midland Railway and an officer arrived and took him into custody.

Midland Railway

Mr. North ca. 1846
Francis Toplis ca. 1848 ca. 1851
Thomas Liddell until 1853 (dismissed)
Edward Darke ca. 1854
Thomas Hirst ca. 1856 - 1860 (discharged)
William Ward 1861 - 1882 (formerly station master at Manton)
Thomas Alexander Watford 1882 - 1890 (formerly station master at Rugby, afterwards station master at Tamworth)
Thomas Walker ca. 1892 - 1894 (afterwards station master at Tamworth)
William Grant 1895 - ca. 1901
John Francis Westcott 1903  - 1921 (formerly station master at Elstree)
Arthur Jackson 1921 - 1930 (formerly station master at Elmton and Creswell, afterwards station master at Berkhamstead)
William Thomas Dickens  1930 - 1940  (from 1936 also station master at Stamford East)
Joseph Henry Marshall until 1946
John E. Pridmore 1946 - 1959
A. Rolling from 1960  (formerly station master at South Lynn)

London and North Western Railway
From 1908 it was agreed that the station be run as a joint station with the Midland Railway, with only one stationmaster.

Jas. McColm 1862 - 1863 (dismissed)
John Maw 1863 - ca. 1871
Samuel Willett ca. 1872 - 1877
George Wallis 1877 - 1897
John Brassington 1897 - 1908

References

External links

 Brief history of Stamford railways

Buildings and structures in Stamford, Lincolnshire
Railway stations in Lincolnshire
DfT Category E stations
Former Midland Railway stations
Railway stations in Great Britain opened in 1848
Railway stations served by East Midlands Railway
Railway stations served by CrossCountry
Grade II* listed railway stations
Grade II* listed buildings in Lincolnshire